Fudbalski klub Polimlje is a football club from Murino, a town between Andrijevica and Plav, Montenegro. They currently compete in the Montenegrin Third League.

History
FK Polimlje was founded in 1934, but they played only non-league games before World War II.
The club's official performances in domestic competitions started during the seventies, when FK Polimlje became a member of the Montenegrin Fourth league. They spent two decades in regional competition and first significant success came in the 1994-95 season. FK Polimlje won the title of the Fourth league - North champion and gained its historical, first-ever promotion to the  Montenegrin Republic League. They played two consecutive seasons in the Republic tier before relegation after the 1996-97 season.
New significant result FK Polimlje made in the 1998-99 season, finishing first in the Fourth league - North, with another promotion to the highest rank. This time, they were relegated after one season, finishing 13th on the table, but only one point less than neighbouring FK Jezero who remained member of the third-tier.
Since that era, FK Polimlje never again played in higher rank and following Montenegrin independence, FK Polimlje became a part of the Montenegrin Third League - North.
Two times FK Polimlje won the title of the Third League - North winner. But both times, they didn't succeed in gaining promotion to the Montenegrin Second League, after defeats in the playoffs. Firstly, they failed to qualify in the 2007-08 season after the playoff games against FK Ribnica (0-2; 2-2) and FK Mornar (2-2; 2-3). Second title, FK Polimlje won in the 2015-16 season, but this time failed to qualify for higher-rank after the playoff games against FK Čelik (0-2; 0-7) and FK Otrant (2-3; 2-2).

Honours and achievements
 Montenegrin Third League – 2
winners (2): 2007–08, 2015–16
 Montenegrin Fourth League – 2
winners (2): 1994–95, 1998–99
 Northern Region Cup – 0
runners-up (3): 2010, 2011, 2014

Current squad

Stadium 

FK Polimlje plays their home games at Stadion u Murinu in Andrijevica. The stadium doesn't meet criteria for any higher rank then the Montenegrin Third League.

See also
Plav, Montenegro
Montenegrin Third League
Montenegrin clubs in Yugoslav football competitions (1946–2006)

References

Football clubs in Yugoslavia
Football clubs in Montenegro
Association football clubs established in 1934
1934 establishments in Montenegro
Andrijevica Municipality